"Bring Me Your Love" is a 1994 song recorded and produced by American-based group Deee-Lite, which was released by Elektra Records as the second single of their third and final studio album, Dewdrops in the Garden. The single was issued as a 12-inch white vinyl and sampled 'The Children's Song' by Eddie Harris.

This would be the act's fifth single to top the number one position on the Billboard dance chart. during the week ending August 13, 1994. The B side included a remix of "Party Happening People," which peaked at number 30 in 1994.

Critical reception 
Larry Flick from Billboard wrote, "Brace yourself for a spankin' new Deee-Lite vibe, as the quirky and cool trio reinvents itself with a flower-power rave attitude. The changes, however, are primarily cosmetic, since a familiar lyrical message of love and unity remains in place–as does a reverence for retro-funk and soul. Lady Kier has grown into quite the seductress, injecting a naughty sass into the song." Music & Media commented, "The one-time masters of weirdelica produce a lite version of their speciality. Do not be put off by the less unconventional first impression." Brad Beatnik from Music Weeks RM Dance Update complimented it as "a fine comeback and an original and interesting package for DJs."

 Formats and track listings US 12" Maxi single'
A1 Bring Me Your Love (Sampladelic Prod. Isness Not Business Mix)  
A2 Bring Me Your Love (DJ Digit Remix)
A3 Bring Me Your Love (DJ EFX Remix)
B1 Party Happenin' People (Sampladelic Prod. Mushroom Mix) 
B2 Bring Me Your Love (Johnny Vicious Cosmic Isness Remix 1)
B3 Bring Me Your Love (Johnny Vicious Cosmic Isness Remix 2)

See also
List of number-one dance singles of 1994 (U.S.)

References

1994 singles
1994 songs
Deee-Lite songs
Elektra Records singles